Henry W. Black (March 26, 1924 - January 13, 2002) was an American politician from Maine. A Republican from West Baldwin, Maine, Black served 2 terms (1984-1988) in the Maine Senate.

In 1996, Black sought the State Representative seat for District 47. He was defeated by incumbent Richard Thompson.

References

1924 births
2002 deaths
People from Baldwin, Maine
Republican Party Maine state senators
20th-century American politicians